Kaelin “K. J.” Jackson (born March 27, 1998) is an American professional basketball player for CSA Steaua București of the Liga Națională. He played college basketball for Temple College and UMBC.

High school career
Jackson attended Hightower High School and played basketball and football. As a senior wide receiver in 2015, he helped the Hurricanes finish with an undefeated season. On the basketball court, Jackson was named district MVP as a senior and led the team to a 32-5 record. He committed to play football at West Texas A&M on February 6, 2016. However, Jackson ultimately reconsidered and opted to play college basketball instead. His only option was to play junior college basketball, so he committed to Temple College after its coach Kirby Johnson noticed him while recruiting another player.

College career
Jackson averaged a team-leading 19.5 points per game as a freshman. He was recruited by UMBC, but decided to return to Temple for his sophomore season. UMBC did not have a scholarship for him at the time. As a sophomore, Jackson finished fifth in the nation with 25.8 points per game. He became Temple’s all-time scoring leader with 1,404 points. Jackson committed to the Retrievers after the season. He watched UMBC upset Virginia in the NCAA Tournament to become the first 16 seed to beat a 1 seed while at a Buffalo Wild Wings, wearing UMBC apparel.

On December 8, 2018, he scored a UMBC career-high 31 points in a 91-76 win against Drexel. Jackson averaged 12.8 points, 3.8 rebounds, and 3.1 assists per game as a junior. He was named to the Second Team All-America East. As a senior, Jackson averaged 13.8 points, 4.4 rebounds, 4.2 assists, and 1.7 steals per game. He was again named to the Second Team All-America East.

Professional career
On August 15, 2020, Jackson signed his first professional contract with CSU Sibiu of the Liga Națională. He averaged 11.5 points, 3.8 assists, 2.8 rebounds, and 1.3 steals per game. On August 4, 2021, Jackson signed with CSA Steaua București.

References

External links
 UMBC Retrievers bio
Temple Leopards bio

1998 births
Living people
American men's basketball players
American expatriate basketball people in Romania
Basketball players from Houston
UMBC Retrievers men's basketball players
Junior college men's basketball players in the United States
Point guards